Narek Sargsyan (born in 1959, Jermuk, Armenia) is the former Minister of Urban Development of Armenia and later Chairman of State Committee on Urban Development until 2018 October.

Narek Sargsyan finished the Yerevan Polytechnic Institute in 1980. He served as Yerevan's Chief Architect in 1999–2004 and from 2011 up to 2014. From 2014 up to 2016 Minister of Urban Development of Armenia.

Biography 
He was born on January 1, 1959, in the town of Jermuk, Vayots Dzor Province, Armenia.

In 1980, he graduated with a diploma of honors from the Architectural department of Yerevan State Polytechnic Institute. During the period of study on a part –time basis worked in the department of research works of Polytechnic Institute (1976–1979)
 1980 - 1983		Lecturer at the department “Architecture of Civil and Industrial buildings” in Yerevan Polytechnic  Institute
 1983 - 1986		Postgraduate student at Moscow Central Research Institute of Experimental design of  residential buildings                                                                                                                                                                    
 1987 - 1993		Lecturer at the department of Architecture of Polytechnic Institute, assistant Professor
 1991 – 1993		Assistant to the Dean of Architectural department of Yerevan Institute of Architecture and Construction                                    
 1993 - 1999		Dean of the Architectural department of Yerevan Institute of  Architecture and  Construction   
 1996 - 1998		Vice chairman of the board of the Union of Architects of Armenia  ( on a voluntary basis )
 1998 - 1999		Adviser to the prime minister of Armenia on urban planning (concurrent)
 1999 - 2000		Chief architect of Yerevan, Deputy Mayor
 2004 - until the present time	 Head of the architectural studio “Narek Sargsyan” ( simultaneously chief architect of the building of Northern Avenue - 2004-2008 )
 2008 - 2011		Chief Architect of Armenia, Deputy Minister of Urban Planning of Armenia.
 2011 - 2013		Chief Architect of Yerevan
 2013 - 2014		Chairman of the State Committee for Architecture under the government of Armenia
 2014 - 2016		Minister of Urban Planning
 2016 - 2018		Chairman of State Committee on Urban Development under the Government of Armenia

List of projects
 Monument in Vayk (1989)
 French school in Gyumri (chief architect of the project)
 Co-authors K. Rashidyants (Armenia ), E.Sargsyan, G.Chepichyan (France ), Marseille – Yerevan, 1993-1997
 Administrative building for Closed joint-Stock Company “Electrocomplex” in Charbakh district, Yerevan Co-author  -K.Rashidyants, Yerevan, 1977
 Five private residential houses in Yerevan and Dilijan Co-author K.Rashidyants, 1989, 1996, 1997
 Embassy of Italy in Armenia (2002-2003)
 Residential complex on Teryan street 66 (on the corner  of Teryan and Isahakyan) Yerevan, 2005  ( Central office of  HSBC bank)
 Memorial board to the memory of professor Lia Kamalyan, Tumanyan street , 11  Yerevan 2006
 Monument to Aram Petrosyan in Gegharqunik, 2007
 Residential and public buildings on Northern Avenue LLC “Local Developers”, Yerevan, 2004-2006
 Residential and public buildings at the intersection of Northern Avenue and Abovyan street, Yerevan 2005
 Residential and trading public complex on Northern Avenue, LLC “ Armenian’ Consent “Yerevan, 2005 – 2007
 Residential and public buildings on Northern Avenue, LLC “ Progress Armenia “ and LLC “ Makared”, Co-author – A.Aleksanyan, Yerevan, 2005 -2006 
 Pedestrian walkways and parking lots on Northern Avenue. Co-author –A.Aleksanyan, 2006
 Multifunctional building on Main Avenue –Arami  street LLC  “Gapbankshin “, Yerevan, 2005 – 2007
 Residential and trading – public complex on Main Avenu   -Byuzand street  Co-author – M.Brumbilla (USA), Yerevan, 2005-2006
 Complex of residential and public buildings, Byuzand-Teryan-Amiryan streets (Main Avenue) Closed Joint Stock Company, Gri Ar, Yerevan, 2004 -2006
 Apartment residential complex on Byuzand 31- Yez.Koghbatsi 25,housing “A”, LLC “Makared”, Yerevan, 2008 
 Multi – storey   residential house on Komitas street 38/2 LLC “Fifth Star”, Yerevan, 2006
 House – museum of Charles Aznavour, Municipal Council, Yerevan 2007-2009
 Housing building of National Academy of Science of Armenia on Baghramyan street 24 a, Yerevan, 2007
 60 unit - hotel on Saryan street, Yerevan 2007  (constructed in 2010-2012)
 Complex of four  multi-storey towers “Yerevan –Berd “ on the territory adjacent to Winery
 On the bank of the Hrazdan river, Yerevan, 2007
 Residential and trading-public complex “Cascade” on Antarain str.160/5
 LLC “Al  amra Real Estate”, Yerevan, 2008                                                     
 Hotel complex on Lalayan –Pushkin str. LLC” HIY Yerevan, 2008
 Complex of multifunctional   apartment house in Davidashen     “Sasna  tsrer -2”, LLC ”Renshin”, 2008
 Multifunctional residential complex on Byuzand str.89-95   LLC “ Renshin”, Yerevan, 2008
 70 –room hotel complex  with SPA centre, Jermuk, 2008 LLC “JerSun”
 The new housing of the residence of the President Armenia on 
 Baghramyan str, 26 Co-author A. Vardanyan, Yerevan 2009
 The house of receptions in the state dacha on Sevan peninsulas, LLC, “Tashir Charitable Foundation”, 2009
 Head office of Armenian Benevolent Union. Co-author –Aris  Adamyan (France)2008 – 2009
 Multifunctional building  on Meliq –Adamyan street, Main Avenue LLC“ J.L.J .Project Company”, Yerevan, 2010
 The new housing of the Republic Party   and the reconstruction of the complex ,
 Yerevan 2009-2010
 Complex of  government administrative buildings on V.Sargsyan street,3, Yerevan, 2012

Awards
 1975    	Gold medal of secondary school
 1980    	Diploma with Honors –Yerevan Polytechnic  Institute
 1980   	Thesis project of a residential complex for 5 thousand residents in Vanadzor (former Kirovakan) (All Union Review )  1st degree diploma. Baku
 1985   	All Union conference of young scientists and specialists on the theme “City and Construction”. 1st degree diploma of the  laureate of scientific and technical creativity (the 1st place in the section of  living environment), Kiev 1987
 1987 	Defense of the PHD thesis. Moscow (specialized doctoral council)
 1988 	Academic degree of candidate of architecture
 1989 	Project for planning, constructing and organizing the living environment. Gyumri (former Leninakan) Diploma of the Union of Architects of Armenia (in the author’s team)
 1990 	2nd All Union review of scientific works of young architects. Diploma of laureate. Moscow
 1990 	Academic degree of assistant professor of Yerevan Architectural and Construction Institute Moscow
 1996	 International review on the best works of architecture.  Diploma of the International  Association of Architects for the project of the French school for 900 seats  (Chief architect of the project, author’s team), Moscow
 1998 	Diploma of the International  Association of the Union of Architects (MACA) for the significant contribution to the development and improvement of architectural education. Moscow
 2002	Chevalier of the National award of French Republic “For merits “
 2002 	Honorary citizen of the town of Jermuk
 2003	Laureate of the State Prize of the Republic of Armenia
 2003 	Certificate of Honor of  Marshal Bagramyan foundation for  active participation in the construction of the monument to Marshal Bagramyan in Yerevan
 2004 	Academic degree of professor of Yerevan Architectural and Construction Institute
 2004 	Certificate of appreciation of the Prime Minister of Armenia
 2005 	Certificate “Chief Architect “ awarded by the Union of Architects of Russia and by the Union of   Chief Architects of CIS, Moscow
 2007   	Laureate of the prize of the Coat of Arms of Yerevan
 2007 	Gold medal of Fridtjof  Nansen
 2007 	Honored architect of Armenia
 2008 	Gold medal of the Engineering Academy of the Republic of  Armenia  “ For outstanding  contribution to science and technology”
 2009 	Full member of the Engineering Academy of the Republic of Armenia
 2010 	Full member of the International Academy of  Engineering
 2010 	Medal of Honor of the National Assembly of the Republic of Armenia for the high level of organization and providing excellent results of work on the reconstruction of the Meeting Hall of the National  Assembly of the  Republic of Armenia 
 2010 	National 2nd degree award “For Merits” of the French Republic
 2011 	Gold medal of  the Ministry of Urban Planning of the Republic of Armenia for outstanding contribution in the field of urban planning.
 2011 	Great Gold Medal of the International Academy of  Engineering                                          
 2012 	Gold Medal of Yerevan State University of Architecture and Construction
 2013	Award “Engineering Glory” of the International Academy of  Engineering, Moscow
 2013 	Full (foreign) member of the Ukrainian Academy of Engineering
 2014 	Full (foreign) member of the Russian Academy of Engineering
 2014 	Honorary title “The Honored Engineer of  Russia”
 2015  State award in the field of architecture and urban planning for the design of the Government’s administrative complex at Vazgen Sargsyan Street in Yerevan
 2015  Anania Shirakatsi Medal for valuable contribution to the field of urban development
 2015 Gold Medal of the Engineering Academy of the Russian Federation
 2016 "Saint Saak- Saint Mesrop" Medal of the Armenian Apostolic Church
 2016 he was awarded in the nomination of "The Best Foreign Building" at the international festival "Zodchestvo-2016" for the new government administrative complex

Gallery

References

External links 
 

Armenian architects
People from Vayots Dzor Province
1959 births
Living people
National Polytechnic University of Armenia alumni
Government ministers of Armenia